Tephritis dioscurea is a species of tephritid or fruit flies in the genus Tephritis of the family Tephritidae.

Distribution
Sweden & France to Kazakhstan & Caucasus, East Russia.

References

Tephritinae
Insects described in 1856
Diptera of Europe